Lord Murray or Baron Murray may refer to:

People

Judicial titles 
 John Murray, Lord Murray (1778–1859), Scottish judge
 Charles Murray, Lord Murray (1866–1936), Scottish Tory politician, lawyer and judge
 David King Murray, Lord Birnam (1884–1955), Scottish advocate and judge, known from 1938 to 1941 as Lord Murray
 Ronald King Murray, Lord Murray (1922-2016), Scottish Labour Member of Parliament 1970–79, and judge

Life peers 
 Keith Murray, Baron Murray of Newhaven KCB (1903–1993), British academic and life peer, Rector of Lincoln College, Oxford
 Len Murray, Baron Murray of Epping Forest (1922–2004), British trade union leader, and Labour Party life peer
 Albert Murray, Baron Murray of Gravesend (1930–1980), British Labour Party politician, MP 1964–70, life peer 1976–80
 Simon Murray, Baron Murray of Blidworth (born 1974), British Conservative Party politician

Hereditary peers and courtesy titles 
 Lord George Murray (bishop) (1761–1803), Anglican Bishop of Saint David's 1801–03, developer of Britain's first optical telegraph
 Lord Henry Murray (1767–1805), British soldier and administrator who served as the fourth Lieutenant Governor of the Isle of Man
 Alexander Murray, 1st Baron Murray of Elibank (1870–1920), Scottish Liberal politician

Ships 

SS Baron Murray, a cargo ship in service with H Hogarth & Sons, Glasgow between 1946 and 1959